Dinochelys (from a reference to the Dinosaur National Monument Visitor Center and Greek chelys, turtle) is an extinct genus of paracryptodiran turtle from the Late Jurassic Morrison Formation.

See also

 Paleobiota of the Morrison Formation

References

Pleurosternidae
Prehistoric turtle genera
Late Jurassic turtles
Late Jurassic reptiles of North America
Morrison fauna
Fossil taxa described in 1979
Taxa named by Eugene S. Gaffney